This is a list of kigo, which are words or phrases that are associated with a particular season in Japanese poetry. They provide an economy of expression that is especially valuable in the very short haiku, as well as the longer linked-verse forms renku and renga, to indicate the season referenced in the poem or stanza.

Japanese seasons
Until 1873, in the Japanese calendar, seasons traditionally followed the lunisolar calendar with the solstices and equinoxes at the middle of a season. The traditional and contemporary months are approximately one month apart from each other, with the traditional New Year falling between late January and early February. The traditional Japanese seasons are:

Spring: 4 February – 5 May
Summer: 6 May – 7 August
Autumn: 8 August – 6 November
Winter: 7 November – 3 February

For kigo, each season is then divided into early (初), mid- (仲), and late (晩) periods. For spring, these would be:

Early spring: 4 February – 5 March (February・First lunar month)
Mid-spring: 6 March – 4 April (March・Second lunar month)
Late spring: 5 April – 5 May (April・Third lunar month)

Saijiki and kiyose
Japanese haiku poets often use a saijiki, a book like a dictionary or almanac for kigo. An entry in a saijiki usually includes a description of the kigo itself, as well as a list of similar or related words, and a few examples of haiku that include that kigo. A kiyose is similar, but contains only lists of kigo. Modern saijiki and kiyose are divided into the four seasons and New Year, with some containing a further section for seasonless (muki) topics. Each section is divided into a standard set of categories, each containing the relevant kigo. The most common categories are:

 The season (時候 jikō)
 The sky and heavens (天文 tenmon)
 The earth (地理 chiri)
 Humanity (生活 seikatsu)
 Observances (行事 gyōji)
 Animals (動物 dōbutsu)
 Plants (植物 shokubutsu)

This is a list of both Japanese and non-Japanese kigo. If the kigo is a Japanese word, or if there is a Japanese translation in parentheses next to the English kigo, then the kigo can be found in most major Japanese saijiki.

[note: An asterisk (*) after the Japanese name for the kigo denotes an external link to a saijiki entry for the kigo with example haiku that is part of the "Japanese haiku: a topical dictionary" website.]

Spring: 4 February – 5 May

The season

all spring
 spring (春 haru) 
 warmth (暖かし atatakashi or 温み nukumi)

early spring (February・First lunar month)
   (睦月 lit. "month of affection") – First lunar month (present-day January)
 February (二月 nigatsu) – when using the solar calendar
 first day of spring (立春 risshun) – First solar term; approx. 4 February
 usui (雨水 lit. "rain water") – Second solar term; approx. 19 February
 signs of spring (春めく haru meku)
 shunkan (春寒) – cold weather in early spring

mid-spring (March・Second lunar month)
 Kisaragi (如月 lit. "like the moon" or 衣更着 lit. "wearing more clothes") – Second lunar month (present-day February)
 March (三月 sangatsu) – when using the solar calendar
 keichitsu (啓蟄) – Third solar term; approx 6 March. Literally translated "awakening hibernating insects", when insects come out of the ground, believed to occur on the first day of the lunar month.
 shunbun (春分) – Fourth solar term; approx. 20 March. Vernal equinox 
 higan (彼岸 higan)

late spring (April・Third lunar month)
 Yayoi (弥生 lit. "increasing life") – Third lunar month (present-day March)
 April (四月 shigatsu) – when using the solar calendar
 seimei (清明 lit. "clear and bright") – Fifth solar term; approx. 5 April
 kokū (穀雨 lit. "grain rain) – Sixth solar term; approx. 20 April
 hanabie (花冷え lit "flowers becoming cold") – chilly spring weather
 fading of spring (行く春 Yuku haru)

The sky and heavens

all spring
 spring mist or haze (霞 kasumi)
 hazy moon (朧月 oborozuki) – 朧 oboro is a type of mist that obscures the moon; kanji composed of radicals for "moon" (月) and "dragon" (龍)
 awayuki (淡雪) – light snowfall
 shunjin (春塵) – frost and snow blown into the air by the spring wind

early spring (February・First lunar month)
 kaiyose (貝寄風 lit. "shell-gathering wind") – west wind that blows seashells ashore; traditionally believed to occur on the night of the vernal equinox

mid-spring (March・Second lunar month)
 haruichiban (春一番) – the first strong southerly wind of the spring

late spring (April・Third lunar month)
 wasurejimo (忘れ霜 lit. "forgotten frost") – late frost

The earth

all spring
 shunchō (春潮) – pleasant tides of spring
 yamawarau (山笑う lit. "laughing mountain") – a mountain covered in flower buds
 haru no umi (春の海) – calm sea of spring

early spring (February・First lunar month)
 usugōri or hakuhyō (薄氷) – thin ice

mid-spring (March・Second lunar month)
 mizu nurumu (水温む) – warming of water (in spring)
 yukima (雪間) – patch of ground without snow

late spring (April・Third lunar month)
 naeshiro or nawashiro (苗代) – seedbed

Humanity
 Spring depression (春愁 shunshū) – all spring
 Sowing (種蒔 tanemaki)

Observances
 Hanamatsuri (花祭り "Blossom Festival"), Buddhist festival celebrating the birth of Buddha, on 8 April.
 Hinamatsuri (雛祭 "Girl's Day", lit. "Doll Festival") – a traditional Japanese festival for girls on 3 March.

Animals
 frogs (蛙 kawazu) – all spring – noted for their loud singing
 skylarks (雲雀 hibari) – all spring – noted for their songs in flight
 swallows (燕 tsubame) – mid-spring
 twittering (囀り saezuri) – all spring – the chirping of songbirds
 Japanese bush warbler (鶯 uguisu (sometimes translated as Japanese nightingale), Cettia diphone) – early spring – the bird is used as an example of sweet sounds. Uguisu were mentioned in the preface to the Kokin Wakashū. It is often associated with ume blossoms and new growth in early Japanese waka and is regarded as a harbinger of spring (春告鳥 harutsugedori, lit. "bird which announces the arrival of Spring").

Plants
 plum blossom (梅 ume) – early spring
 cherry blossoms (桜 sakura) and cherry blossom-viewing (花見 hanami) – late spring (April) –  for the Japanese, cherry blossoms are such a common topic that in just mentioning blossoms (hana) in haiku it is assumed they are cherry blossoms. Hanami is an occasion for partying with friends or coworkers.
willow (柳 yanagi) – mid-spring

Summer: 6 May – 7 August

The season
 dog days
 midsummer (夏至祭 geshimatsuri)
 summer (夏 natsu); other combinations are to become like summer (夏めく natsu meku), end of summer (夏の果て natsu no hate). summer holidays (夏休み natsu yasumi) primarily refers to the school holiday.
May (皐月 satsuki or 五月 gogatsu), June (水無月 minazuki or 六月 rokugatsu), July (文月 fumizuki, fuzuki or 七月 shichigatsu)
hot (暑し atsushi), hotness (暑さ atsusa) and hot day (暑き日 atsuki hi); also, anything related to the heat, including sweat (汗 ase) and in contemporary haiku, air conditioning (冷房 reibō)

The sky and heavens
 rainbow (虹 niji)
 Rainy season (梅雨 tsuyu) – the Japanese rainy season, usually starting in mid-June
 sea of clouds (雲海 unkai) – late summer
 kiu (喜雨) – late summer – lit. "pleasure rain"; rain that falls after hot and dry weather
 south wind (南風 minami)

The earth
shitatari (滴り) – "dripping", referring to water trickling off rocks, moss, etc. 
waterfall (滝 taki)

Humanity
 nap or siesta (昼寝 hirune)
 nudity (裸 hadaka)
 summer sports: surfing, beach volleyball, rollerblading and skateboarding
 sushi (寿司, 鮓, 鮨)
jinbei (甚平) – traditional informal summer clothes
swimming pool (プール pūru)

Observances

A-Bomb Anniversary (6 August) (原爆忌 genbakuki) – Either summer or autumn due to the proximinity between traditional and modern calendars
 Tango no sekku (端午の節句) – traditional festival for boys on 5 May (See Hinamatsuri in spring for the girls' festival). 
 Festival (祭 matsuri) is applied to summer festivals of Shinto for purification. Traditionally, it referred to the festival of Kamo Shrine in Kyoto, however as kigo it can be applied to all local Shinto festivals.

Animals

 cicada (蝉 semi) – late summer – known for their cries
 lesser cuckoo (時鳥 hototogisu) – all summer – a bird in the cuckoo family noted for its song
 jellyfish (海月 kurage, lit. "sea moon")
 mosquito (蚊 ka)
 snake (蛇 hebi)

Plants

 lily (百合 yuri)
 lotus flower (蓮 hasu or hachisu)
 orange blossoms (蜜柑 mikan)
 sunflower (向日葵 himawari)
 wisteria (藤 fuji)
 tachibana orange (橘 tachibana)
 iris (菖蒲 ayame, shōbu or sōbu) – early summer (May)
 water lily (睡蓮 suiren) – mid and late summer.

Autumn: 8 August – 6 November

The season
 autumn (秋 aki); other combinations are autumn has come (秋来ぬ aki kinu), autumn is ending (秋果つ aki hatsu), autumn being gone (行く秋 yuku aki).
 August (葉月 hazuki or 八月 hachigatsu), September (長月 nagatsuki or 九月 kugatsu) and October (神無月 kannazuki or 十月 jūgatsu)
 end of September (九月尽 kugatsujin), end of autumn (秋の果て aki no hate).

The sky and heavens
 Milky Way (天の川 amanogawa, lit. "river of heaven") – most visible in Japan in autumn. It is also associated with Tanabata (七夕).
 moon (月 tsuki) – all autumn
 Tsukimi (月見 lit. "moon-viewing") – mid-autumn (September) – the word "moon" by itself is assumed to be a full moon in autumn. Moon-viewing 
 typhoon (台風 taifū or 野分 nowaki)

The earth
 Field of flowers (花野 hanano)
 Shiranui (不知火)
 Harvested rice fields (刈田 karita)

Humanity

 scarecrow (案山子 kakashi　or 鳥威し toriodoshi)
 rice harvest (稲刈 inekari)
 Imonikai (芋煮会)
 leaf peeping (紅葉狩 momijigari) – a common group activity

Observances
 Tanabata (七夕) (the festival of the weaver maiden and the herdsman in the Heavenly Court)
 grave-visiting (墓参 haka mairi or bosan)
 Bon Festival (盆 bon) 
 mukaebi (迎火) – bonfires welcoming the ancestorsand
 bon odori (盆踊). 

The traditional date of Tanabata is 7th day of the 7th month of the Japanese calendar, which falls in early Autumn. The modern use of the Gregorian one has moved the observance to 7 July, which has resulted in a dispute as to whether Tanabata should be treated as a summer kigo.

Animals
 insects (虫 mushi), mainly it implies singing one. 
 crickets (蟋蟀 kōrogi)  – all autumn (August–October)  – noted for the singing of the males.
 bell cricket (鈴虫 suzumushi)
 walker's cicada (法師蝉 hōshizemi lit. "Buddhist priest cicada")
 Deer (鹿 shika)

Plants

 nashi pear (梨 nashi)
 Chaenomeles (木瓜の実 boke no mi)
 peach (桃 momo)
 persimmon (柿 kaki)
 apples (林檎 ringo)
 grapes (葡萄 budō)
 colored leaves (椛momiji or 紅葉 kōyō) – late autumn (October) –  a very common topic for haiku
 first colored leaves (初紅葉 hatsu-momiji or hatsu-momijiba) – mid-autumn
 shining leaves (照葉 teriha) – late autumn
 leaves turning color (薄紅葉 usumomiji) – mid-autumn
 leaves start to fall (紅葉かつ散る momiji katsu chiru) – late autumn

Winter: 7 November – 3 February

The season
 winter (冬 fuyu), using "winter" in a haiku adds a sense of chilliness (literally and figuratively), bleakness, and seclusion to the poem.
 November (霜月 shimotsuki or 十一月 jūichigatsu), December (師走 shiwasu or 十二月 jūnigatsu) and January (睦月mutsuki or 一月 ichigatsu)
 cold (寒し samushi) and coldness (寒さ samusa)

The sky and heavens
 snow (雪 yuki)
 Indian summer (小春日和 koharubiyori lit. "small spring weather") – a period of unseasonable warmth, usually in late autumn to early winter
 frost-covered trees (樹氷 juhyō)
 north wind (北風 kitakaze or hokufū) – indicating the coming of cold weather
 shigure (時雨) – rain in late autumn or early winter

The earth
 yama-nemuru (山眠る) – lit. "sleeping mountain", evoking a sense of stillness in the mountains
 kitsunebi (狐火 lit. "fox fire") – a type of atmospheric ghost light mostly associated with winter
 winter landscape (冬景色 fuyugeshiki) – Evokes the sense of a "winter wonderland"

Humanity
 snow-viewing (雪見 yukimi) – late winter (January) – a popular group activity in Japan.
 fugu soup (河豚汁 fugujiru)
 Anglerfish hotpot (鮟鱇鍋 ankō nabe)
 calendar vendor (暦売 koyomiuri) – preparation for the new year.
 asazuke (浅漬) – lightly pickled vegetables
 breath vapor (息白し ikishiroshi)

Observances
 Christmas　(クリスマス kurisumasu or 降誕祭 kōtansai) – this is a modern kigo and uncommon in the Edo period.
 New Year's Eve (大晦日 ōmisoka 年の夜 toshi no yo or 除夜 joya), and the New Year's Eve party (年忘 toshiwasure)
 Kan (寒 kan lit. "coldness") – days from 5–6 January until 4–5 February, originating from the Chinese 24 seasonal periods. Also daikan (lit. "great coldness") a period that begins around 20 January.

Animals
 crane (鶴 tsuru)
 swan (白鳥 hakuchō)
 badger (あなぐま anaguma)
 rabbit (兎 usagi)
 wolf (狼 ōkami)
 hibernation (冬眠 tōmin)
 whale watching (鯨見 kujirami) – the number of whales off the coast peak at different times of the year depending on the region. In Japan, whales are most often seen during the winter.
 oyster (牡蠣 kaki)
 waterfowl sleeping on water (浮寝鳥 ukinedori)

Plants

 winter chrysanthemum (冬菊 fuyugiku or 寒菊 kangiku)
 daffodil (水仙 suisen lit. "water immortal")
 ornamental kale (葉牡丹  habotan)
 false holly (柊 hiragi or hīragi)
 fallen leaves (落葉 ochiba)
 dry leaves (枯葉 kareha)

New Year
As in many other cultures, the Japanese New Year is an important time of year for celebrations and there are many activities associated with it that may be mentioned in haiku. Before Japan began using the Gregorian calendar in 1873, the Japanese New Year was at the beginning of spring. Many of these terms reflect the traditional calendar system.

The season
 Japanese New Year (正月 shōgatsu) *
 New Year (新年 shinnen)
 New Year's Day (元日 ganjitsu or gannichi)
 New Year's Day (元旦 gantan) – refers to the dawn or morning of New Year's Day
 Old Year (旧年 kyūnen or furutoshi)
 Little New Year (小正月 koshōgatsu) – traditionally celebrated on the 15th day of the month during the full moon
 Women's New Year (女正月 onnashōgatsu) – same as above, referring to women who were too busy to celebrate the actual new year, especially in Osaka and Kyoto regions.

The sky and heavens
 First Day (初日 hatsuhi)
 First Sky (初空 hatsusora or hatsuzora) – the sky on New Year's morning
 first laughter ( hatsuwarai or waraizome) – indicating good fortune
Each day of first week of the new year is treated as kigo, such as the seventh day of the new year (七日 nanoka, lit. "the seventh day").

Humanity
 kadomatsu * (門松) – a traditional decoration usually made of pine and bamboo that is placed on the gate or outer doorway 
 toshidama (年玉) – the custom of giving pocket money to children
 toso (屠蘇) – a ritual mulled sake only drunk on New Year's Day
 osechi (御節) – traditional Japanese New Year's Day food
 zōni (雑煮) * – a traditional vegetable broth with mochi
 Festival of Seven Herbs (七草の節句 Nanakusa no sekku) –  a festival centered around eating seven-herb congee (七草粥 nanakusagayu)
 first writing (書初 kakizome) – the first calligraphy written around the New Year

Observances
 Namahage (生剥) – a ritualized folktale in Akita Prefecture
 Hatsumōde (初詣) – the first visit of the year to a Shinto shrine
 New Year's Sumo Tournament (初場所 hatsubasho)
 First Poetry Reading (歌会始 utakai-hajime)
 Ehōmairi ([[:ja:恵方詣|恵方詣) – visit to a shrine or temple that lies in an auspicious direction

Animals
 yomegakimi (嫁が君) – a euphemism for mouse, used for the first three days of the New Year
 first sparrow (初雀 hatsu-suzume) * – the first sparrow helps welcome the New Year
 first sound (初声 hatsukoe) – the first cry of an animal in the New Year
 first cockcrow (初鶏 hatsutori)
 Japanese spiny lobster (伊勢海老 ise-ebi)

Plants
 young greens {若菜 wakana)
 false daphne (楪 yuzuriha) – used in decoration
 henbit (仏の座 hotoke-no-za lit. "Buddha's seat") – one of the seven spring flowers (春の七草 haru-no-nanakusa)

See also
 Haiku
 Haiku in English
 Culture of Japan
 Hokku
 Renku
 Renga
 Saijiki

Helpful lists of species
Birds
 Lists of birds by region
 List of Japanese birds: passerines
 List of Japanese birds: non-passerines

Sources
 『入門歳時記』大野林火監修、俳句文学館編。角川書店  、. [Title: "Introductory Saijiki", editor: "Ōno Rinka", Publisher: Kadokawa Shoten ]
 Haiku World: An International Poetry Almanac by William J. Higginson, Kodansha International  1996  (An international haiku saijiki with over 1,000 haiku and senryu from poets in 50 countries covering 680 seasonal topics)
 The Haiku Seasons: Poetry of the Natural World by William J. Higginson, Kodansha International © 1996  (a companion book to Haiku World discussing the development of haiku, and the importance of the seasons and kigo to haiku)

External links
  The five hundred essential Japanese season words Selected by Kenkichi Yamamoto and translated by William J. Higginson and Kris Young Kondo
 The Traditional Seasons of Japanese Poetry by William J. Higginson
 Japanese Haiku – a Topical Dictionary at the Univ. of Virginia Japanese Text Initiative a work-in-progress based on the Nyu-mon Saijiki by the Museum of Haiku Literature in Tokyo, most translations by William J. Higginson and Lewis Cook
 The Yuki Teikei Haiku Season Word List from the Yuki Teikei Haiku Society (Northern California)
 World Kigo Database Gabi Greve's project supported by the World Haiku Club
 A Dictionary of Haiku – Classified by Season Words with Traditional and Modern Methods by Jane Reichhold
 Haiku in Twelve Months at the Kiyoshi Memorial Museum (Takahama Kyoshi)
 Season words from the Shiki mailing list kukai
Spring season words
Summer season words
Autumn season words
Winter season words

Poetic devices
Japanese culture-related lists
Literature lists